Marin Mikac (born 20 April 1982) is a Croatian football manager and retired player.

Club career
As a player, Mikac had a globetrotting career, playing for local giants Rijeka and Osijek as well as in Greece, Malaysia and Lebanon.

Managerial career
Mikas was named manager of Orijent 1919 in October 2018, succeeding Danilo Butorović. In March 2020, he took the reigns at Uljanik after Ivan Kukučka resigned. In August 2022, he was appointed manager of NK Halubjan, succeeding Neven Strukan.

References

External links

1982 births
Living people
Footballers from Rijeka
Association football midfielders
Association football forwards
Croatian footballers
Croatia youth international footballers
HNK Rijeka players
NK Pomorac 1921 players
NK Istra 1961 players
NK Osijek players
UPB-MyTeam FC players
A.O. Kerkyra players
Al Ansar FC players
HNK Orijent players
NK Jadran Poreč players
NK Nehaj players
Croatian Football League players
First Football League (Croatia) players
Malaysia Premier League players
Football League (Greece) players
Lebanese Premier League players
Croatian expatriate footballers
Expatriate footballers in Malaysia
Croatian expatriate sportspeople in Malaysia
Expatriate footballers in Greece
Croatian expatriate sportspeople in Greece
Expatriate footballers in Lebanon
Croatian expatriate sportspeople in Lebanon
Croatian football managers
HNK Orijent managers
Croatian expatriate football managers
Expatriate football managers in Slovenia
Croatian expatriate sportspeople in Slovenia